Alfie is a 1966 British comedy-drama film directed by Lewis Gilbert and starring Michael Caine. An adaptation by Bill Naughton of his own 1966 novel and 1963 play of the same name, the film was released by Paramount Pictures.

Alfie tells the story of a young womanising man who leads a self-centred life, purely for his own enjoyment, until events force him to question his uncaring behaviour, his loneliness and his priorities. He cheats on numerous women, and despite his confidence towards women, he treats them with disrespect and refers to them as "it", using them for sex and for domestic purposes. Alfie frequently breaks the fourth wall by speaking directly to the camera narrating and justifying his actions. His words often contrast with or totally contradict his actions.

The film had its World Premiere at the Plaza Theatre in the West End of London on 24 March 1966. A box office success, it received critical acclaim and is an influential part of British cinema.

Plot
Alfie Elkins, a handsome Cockney, self-centered, narcissistic chauffeur in London, enjoys the sexual favours of married and single women while avoiding commitment. He is ending an affair with Siddie, a married woman, just as he gets his submissive single girlfriend, Gilda, pregnant. Alfie thinks nothing of pilfering fuel and money from his employer and tells Gilda to do the same. Although he refuses to marry her, and despite his constant cheating, Gilda decides to have the child, Malcolm Alfred, and keep him rather than give him up.

Over time, Alfie becomes quite attached to his delightful son, but his unwillingness to marry Gilda causes her to break up with him and marry Humphrey, a kindly bus conductor and neighbour. He loves her and is willing to accept Malcolm Alfred as his own. Gilda bars Alfie from any further contact with Malcolm, forcing him to watch from a distance as Humphrey steps into his fatherly role. When a health check reveals Alfie has tubercular shadows on his lungs, the diagnosis and his fear of death, combined with his separation from his son, lead him to have a brief mental breakdown.

Alfie spends time recuperating in a pastoral sanitorium, where he befriends Harry, a fellow patient, a family man devoted to his frumpy wife Lily. Alfie makes out with one of the nurses, disgusting Harry. Alfie thinks nothing of cheating, lying, stealing, or taking other men's wives. When Alfie flippantly suggests that Lily might be cheating on him, Harry angrily confronts Alfie about his attitudes and behaviour.

Released from the convalescent home, Alfie briefly stops working as a chauffeur to take holiday photos of tourists near the Tower of London. Here he meets Ruby, an older, voluptuous, affluent and promiscuous American, who, although she is accompanied by an older gentleman, gives him her address and telephone number.

Alfie returns to chauffeuring and drives a Rolls-Royce to the sanitorium to visit Harry. He finds Lily finishing a visit with her husband, who asks him to give his wife a ride back to London to save her an exhausting train ride. Neither initially want to spend time together, but they agree in order to please Harry. Along the way, they stop for tea and then a canoe ride where he seduces her.

Later, chauffeuring in the Rolls again, Alfie sees a young red-headed hitchhiker, Annie, who wants a fresh start in London. A lorry driver picks her up just before Alfie gets to her. He follows them to a cafe and steals her away to London. She moves into his bedsit where she proves preoccupied with a love left behind, scrubbing Alfie's floor, doing his laundry, and preparing his meals to compensate. The lorry driver finds him in a pub, punches him in the face and a barroom brawl ensues.

Coming home with a big black eye, Alfie grows resentful of Annie and drives her out with an angry outburst, immediately regretting it. Around the same time, Lily informs him that she is pregnant from their one encounter, and they plan for her to have an abortion. Lily comes to his flat to meet the abortionist. During the procedure, Alfie leaves Lily and walks around. He catches sight of his son Malcolm outside a church and witnesses the baptism of Gilda and Humphrey's new daughter. He watches as they exit the church as a family. The abortion traumatizes both Lily and Alfie; he breaks down in tears when seeing the aborted fetus, the first time he confronts the consequences of his actions.

The stress of the situations with Annie and Lily makes Alfie decide to change his non-committal ways and settle down with the rich Ruby. However, visiting her, he finds a younger man in her bed. He comes across Siddie (the married woman from the beginning of the movie), but she has lost interest in him and returned to her husband. Alfie is left lonely, wondering about his life choices; he asks the viewers, "What's it all about? You know what I mean."

Cast

Production
The film is unusual in that it has no opening credits and the end credits feature photos of the principal actors, as well as of the main technical crew, including director Gilbert and cameraman Otto Heller.

Casting
Several leading actors, including Richard Harris, Laurence Harvey, James Booth and Anthony Newley, turned down the title role due to the then-taboo subject matter. Despite having played "Alfie" on Broadway, Terence Stamp categorically declined to reprise the role on film, so he and casting agents approached his good friend and then roommate Michael Caine: not one to then snub a role about a common man, Caine agreed to do it. He received a positive reception for the role.

Filming
It was shot at Twickenham Studios with scenes shot at several locations in London; including Waterloo Bridge which is seen at the beginning and end of the film where the title character walks into the distance accompanied by a stray dog and Tower Bridge which is the backdrop for the photography scene with Shelley Winters.

Music
The original film soundtrack featured jazz saxophonist Sonny Rollins with London musicians including Stan Tracey on piano, who improvised "Little Malcolm Loves His Dad" (although never credited), Rick Laird on bass, Phil Seamen on drums, Ronnie Scott on tenor sax.

The Sonny Rollins album Alfie, orchestrated and conducted by Oliver Nelson, was recorded in the United States in January 1966. It features Rollins with J.J. Johnson – trombone (tracks 1 & 2), Jimmy Cleveland – trombone (tracks 3–6), Phil Woods – alto saxophone, Bob Ashton – tenor saxophone, Danny Bank – baritone saxophone, Roger Kellaway – piano, Kenny Burrell – guitar, Walter Booker – bass and Frankie Dunlop – drums

The title song, "Alfie", written by Burt Bacharach and Hal David, was sung by Cher over the film's closing credits in the US release reaching #32 on the Billboard Hot 100 chart. It became a hit for British singer Cilla Black (Millicent Martin sang Alfie on its British release) and for Madeline Eastman and Dionne Warwick.

Reception
On Rotten Tomatoes the film has an approval rating of 97%, based on reviews from 29 critics, with an average rating of 8/10. The site's consensus states: "Anchored by Michael Caine's charmingly droll performance, Alfie is an equally raucous and heart-rending portrait of romance in the Swinging '60s."

Bosley Crowther, film reviewer for The New York Times, singled out Vivien Merchant's acting for particular praise:

Accolades

Legacy
The 1966 film was followed by Alfie Darling (1975), with Alan Price replacing Caine. An updated 2004 remake starred Jude Law in the title role.

References in popular culture
 Much of the film's dialogue was sampled by the band Carter USM for their 1991 album 30 Something.
 The LP, Nino Tempo's Rock 'N Roll Beach Party (1956 Liberty Records ... LRP3023) can be seen hanging in Alfie's apartment in several key scenes.
 New York post-hardcore band Polar Bear Club references "Alfie Elkins '66" in their song "Drifting Thing" off their 2009 release Chasing Hamburg.
 The soundtrack to Austin Powers in Goldmember (in which Caine co-stars) contains a song entitled "Alfie (What's It All About Austin)" performed by Susanna Hoffs. This song is a cover of the original film's title song, with all occurrences of "Alfie" replaced with "Austin". A deleted scene has the cast performing the song.
 The film inspired The Divine Comedy's Becoming More Like Alfie, which samples its opening dialogue in its introduction.
 Guitarist Jeff Beck quoted the title song's melody in his instrumental showpiece "Jeff's Boogie", released a few months after the film's premiere.
 Singer/songwriter Tori Amos performed the theme as part of her repertoire as a teen, and references it in the song "Gold Dust" from her 2002 album Scarlet's Walk.
 British Pop Art artist Pauline Boty makes a brief appearance as the manageress of a Dry-Cleaner's whom Alfie visits for sex. Boty died just over three months after the film's UK premiere.
In the second episode of the third season of Emily in Paris, Lily Collins sings the song Alfie.

See also
 BFI Top 100 British films

References

External links
 
 
 
 , Screenshots from the film

1966 plays
1966 films
1966 comedy-drama films
1960s English-language films
1960s sex comedy films
British comedy-drama films
British films based on plays
British sex comedy films
Casual sex in films
Films about abortion
Films about adultery in the United Kingdom
Films directed by Lewis Gilbert
Films set in London
Films shot in London
Paramount Pictures films
Plays by Bill Naughton
1960s British films